Boswellia pirottae is a species of plant in the Burseraceae family. Endemic to Ethiopia, it is threatened by habitat loss.

References

pirottae
Endemic flora of Ethiopia
Taxonomy articles created by Polbot
Taxa named by Emilio Chiovenda